Best Township is a geographic township comprising a portion of the municipality of Temagami in Nipissing District, Northeastern Ontario, Canada. It is used for geographic purposes, such as land surveying and natural resource explorations. Neighbouring geographic townships include Gillies Limited Township to the north, Banting Township to the west, Chambers Township to the southwest, and Strathy and Cassels townships to the south.

Localities
Rib Lake
James Lake
Northland Pyrite Mine

Notes

References

Townships of Temagami